Kukhterin Lug is a rural locality (a selo) in uralovsky Selsoviet of Shimanovsky District, Amur Oblast, Russia. The population was 17 as of 2018. There are 3 streets.

Geography 
Kukhterin Lug is located on the Zeya River, 588 km northeast of Shimanovsk (the district's administrative centre) by road. Uralovka is the nearest rural locality.

References 

Rural localities in Shimanovsky District